Hugh Bell may refer to:
Hugh Bell (photographer) (1927–2012), American photographer
Hugh Bell (educator) (1780–1860), member of the Nova Scotia House of Assembly
Sir Hugh Bell, 2nd Baronet (1844–1931), mayor of Middlesbrough
Sir Hugh Bell, 4th Baronet (1923–1970), of the Bell baronets

See also
Bell (surname)